Aneuthetochorus is a genus of beetles in the family Cerambycidae, containing the following species:

 Aneuthetochorus bivestitus (Martins, 1962)
 Aneuthetochorus conjunctus Napp & Martins, 1984
 Aneuthetochorus punctatus Martins, Galileo & de-Oliveira, 2009
 Aneuthetochorus simplex Martins, 1970

References

Ibidionini